San Jorge is Spanish for Saint George.

San Jorge may refer to:

Argentina
 Autódromo Parque de la Velocidad de San Jorge, a motorsports circuit
 San Jorge de Tucumán, a football club
 San Jorge Gulf, a bay opening to the Atlantic

Bolivia
 Laguna San Jorge, a lake
 San Jorge, La Paz, a neighborhood in La Paz

Colombia
 San Jorge River, a river
 Apostolic Vicariate of San Jorge, former Roman Catholic vicariate in Montelíbano

El Salvador
 San Jorge, San Miguel

Guatemala
 San Jorge, Zacapa

Honduras
 San Jorge, Ocotepeque
 Estadio San Jorge, a sports stadium
 San Jorge de Olancho, a former town near Olanchito

Mexico
 San Jorge Nuchita
 San Jorge Nuchita Mixtec, a regional language

Nicaragua
 San Jorge, Rivas

Paraguay
 San Jorge (Asunción), a neighborhood

Philippines
 San Jorge, Samar

Puerto Rico
 Academia San Jorge, a school in San Juan

Solomon Islands
 San Jorge Island, an island

Spain
 San Jorge, Castellón, a municipality in Valencia Community
 Iglesia de San Jorge (Manzaneda), a church in Asturias
 Iglesia de San Jorge (A Coruña), a church in Galicia
 Church of San Jorge (Alcalá de los Gazules)
 Order of San Jorge de Alfama, a former Aragonese order of chivalry
 San Jorge de Heres, a parish also known as Heres (Gozón)
 San Jorge, a parish also known as La Peral
 Castle of San Jorge (Seville)

United States
 San Jorge, a nickname for St. George, Utah

Uruguay
 San Jorge, Uruguay

See also
 São Jorge (disambiguation) - Portuguese
 Saint George (disambiguation)  - English